In the Days of Daniel Boone is a 1923 American silent Western film serial directed by William James Craft. The film is considered to be lost. A trailer is included in the DVD More Treasures from American Film Archives, 1894-1931: 50 Films.

Cast

Chapter titles

 His Country's Need
 At Sword's Point
 Liberty or Death
 Foiling the Regulators
 Perilous Paths
 Trapped
 In the Hands of the Enemy
 Over the Cliff
 The Flaming Forest
 Running the Gauntlet
 The Wilderness Trail
 The Fort in the Forest
 The Boiling Springs
 Chief Blackfish Attacks
 Boone's Triumph

See also
 List of film serials
 List of film serials by studio

References

External links
 
 
 

1923 films
1923 lost films
1923 Western (genre) films
American silent serial films
American black-and-white films
Lost Western (genre) films
Universal Pictures film serials
Films directed by William James Craft
Lost American films
Cultural depictions of George Washington
Cultural depictions of James Monroe
Silent American Western (genre) films
1920s American films